Straneotia is a genus of beetles in the family Carabidae, containing the following species:

 Straneotia amazonica Mateu, 1961 - Brazil
 Straneotia confundis Aldebron & Erwin, 2018 - Ecuador
 Straneotia cylindroceps Erwin & Aldebron, 2018 - French Guiana
 Straneotia freyi Mateu, 1961 - Brazil
 Straneotia moi Aldebron & Erwin, 2018 - Ecuador

References

Lebiinae